Rotspitz (literally redpeak) is a mountain in Liechtenstein, located close to the Swiss border, due east of the Swiss town of Wartau.

References
 www.hikr.org

Mountains of the Alps
Mountains of Liechtenstein